St. George's Parish Vestry House, also known as Spesutia Vestry House, is a historic Episcopal vestry house located at Perryman, Harford County, Maryland. It is a small structure of Flemish bond brick construction dating to about 1766.

It was listed on the National Register of Historic Places in 1976.

References

External links
, including photo from 1997, at Maryland Historical Trust

Episcopal church buildings in Maryland
Churches in Harford County, Maryland
Churches on the National Register of Historic Places in Maryland
Religious buildings and structures completed in 1766
18th-century Episcopal church buildings
National Register of Historic Places in Harford County, Maryland
1766 establishments in the Thirteen Colonies